The San Francisco District Attorney's Office is the legal agency charged with prosecuting crimes in the City and County of San Francisco, California. 
The current district attorney is Brooke Jenkins. Occupants of this office have gone on to higher elected offices, including: governor of California, United States Senator, and vice president of the United States.

History
After the Consolidation Act of 1856 consolidated San Francisco as a city and a county, Henry H. Byrne was elected as the first District Attorney.  Twenty-seven people have held the title since Byrne, including Boudin.

Kamala D. Harris (2004–2011)

On January 8, 2004, Kamala Harris was sworn in as the first female, first African American, and first Indian American district attorney of San Francisco after having defeated Terence Hallinan. She would serve as the first Indian American district attorney in U.S. history, and the first African American district attorney in California. Harris was re-elected in 2007 running unopposed, and was sworn in for her second term by U.S. Senator Dianne Feinstein. Subsequently, Harris became Attorney General of California in 2011, U.S. Senator in 2017, and Vice President of the United States in 2021.

George Gascón (2011–2019)
On January 9, 2011, Mayor Gavin Newsom appointed SFPD Chief George Gascón as district attorney to succeed Kamala Harris, who had been elected California attorney general in November 2010. Gascón was subsequently elected in his own right in November 2011. On October 2, 2018, Gascón announced that he would not seek re-election, citing his mother's health. On October 3, 2019, Gascón announced that he would resign as district attorney on October 18 in order to explore a run for Los Angeles district attorney.

2019 district attorney election

After Gascón announced in 2018 that he would not seek re-election, San Francisco anticipated its first open race for district attorney since 1909, with candidates Chesa Boudin, Leif Dautch, Suzy Loftus, and Nancy Tung entering the race.  After Gascón announced his resignation in October 2019 prior to the November 2019 election, Mayor London Breed appointed candidate Suzy Loftus as interim district attorney, whom Breed had endorsed in the November 2019 election.  Loftus served as interim district attorney from October 19, 2019, until January 8, 2020, when winning candidate Boudin took office.

Chesa Boudin (2020–2022)
Chesa Boudin was sworn in as district attorney on January 8, 2020. Heavily criticized for his perceived softness on crime, Boudin was the subject of a recall election on June 7, 2022. In the recall election, 55.05% of voters supported removing him from office. Mayor London Breed, who had backed a more moderate Democrat in the 2019 district attorney race, named Brooke Jenkins, a former corporate lawyer and prosecutor in the district attorney's office as Boudin's replacement.

List of San Francisco district attorneys

References

 
Government of San Francisco
1856 establishments in California